For the 1973 Vuelta a España, the field consisted of 80 riders; 62 finished the race.

By rider

By nationality

References

1973 Vuelta a España
1973